Joseph Gerard Dooley III (born January 29, 1965) is the former head men's basketball coach of the East Carolina University Pirates, having previously served as head coach from 1995 to 1999 and 2018-2022.  Dooley was an assistant on the Kansas Jayhawks 2007–08 NCAA national championship team. and previously served as head coach at Florida Gulf Coast University.

Dooley is a 1988 graduate of George Washington University in Washington, D.C., where he completed his bachelor's degree in speech communications. A four-year letter winner in basketball at George Washington, he started his last two seasons and was elected a team captain as a senior. A native of West Orange, New Jersey, Dooley was a prep player at St. Benedicts High School in New Jersey where he scored 1,140 career points. He is married to Tanya and has a son named Max.

College coaching history

Early coaching jobs
In 1988, Dooley joined George Felton's staff at the University of South Carolina. While on staff there, the Gamecocks earned a berth in the 1989 NCAA Division I men's basketball tournament and the 1991 National Invitation Tournament. In 1991, he followed fellow South Carolina assistant Eddie Payne to East Carolina. His role involved coaching the backcourt, scheduling, and recruiting. He helped the team earn a championship in the 1993 CAA men's basketball tournament and a berth in the NCAA tournament; the program's first in 21 years.

East Carolina
After the 1994–1995 season, Eddie Payne departed the Pirate program for Oregon State. Dooley was promoted to head coach of East Carolina. At age 29, he was the youngest head coach in the nation. In his first three years, his teams posted 45 wins (the most of any head coach of the program in the same time period). Despite still being the only head coach for the Pirates' program to have an overall winning record at 57–52, he was fired from the job after the 1999 season.

As an assistant
After leaving ECU, Dooley spent stints as an assistant at New Mexico, Wyoming, and Kansas. While on Bill Self's staff at Kansas Dooley was known as a great recruiter, bringing in players such as Cole Aldrich, Mario Chalmers, Tyrel Reed, Russell Robinson, Tyshawn Taylor, and Sasha Kaun. After 10 years on the Jayhawks' staff, Dooley accepted the head coaching job at Florida Gulf Coast.

Florida Gulf Coast
Dooley won twenty or more games in all five years of his tenure with the Eagles. In 2017, he became FGCU's first coach to be named Atlantic Sun coach of the year, he earned his second honor in 2018. He earned two NCAA tournaments and two NITs at the school.

Return to East Carolina
Following the 2017–2018 season, Dooley was hired as head coach at East Carolina, where he had previously been the head coach.

On March 11, 2022, Dooley was fired a second time by East Carolina, compiling a 101-119 record in his two-stints.

Head coaching record

References

External links
 Florida Gulf Coast Eagles bio
 Kansas Jayhawks bio

1966 births
Living people
American men's basketball coaches
American men's basketball players
Basketball coaches from New Jersey
Basketball players from New Jersey
College men's basketball head coaches in the United States
East Carolina Pirates men's basketball coaches
Florida Gulf Coast Eagles men's basketball coaches
George Washington Colonials men's basketball players
Kansas Jayhawks men's basketball coaches
New Mexico Lobos men's basketball coaches
People from West Orange, New Jersey
South Carolina Gamecocks men's basketball coaches
Sportspeople from Essex County, New Jersey
Wyoming Cowboys basketball coaches